Every Best Singles: Complete is a singles compilation by Japanese duo Every Little Thing, released on December 23, 2009, through Avex Trax.

Background 
A set of four CDs and two DVDs, this album is the first to include all their singles from their debut to that time, and also the first time the band includes all their music videos in one DVD release. An encore press of the album was released on  March 3, 2010.

The only new song in the album is a remix of the band's 1998 hit "Time Goes By" made by Kenji "Kj" Furuya of Dragon Ash.

Chart performance 
The album peaked at number four on the Oricon Weekly Album Charts, it stayed in the charts for 24 weeks and was the 43rd best selling album of 2010 in Japan.

Track listing 

Notes
 co-arranged by Every Little Thing
 co-arranged by Ichiro Ito

Personnel 
Directed By – Satoshi Shirota
Executive Producer – Max Matsuura
Mastered By – Yasuji Maeda
String arrangements – Tatsuya Murayama

Charts

References 

2009 greatest hits albums
Every Little Thing (band) compilation albums